Hermanis Saltups (1901–1968) was a Latvian football goalkeeper. While playing with JKS Riga, Saltups became one of the footballers who participated in the first ever international game for Latvia national football team (against Estonia on 24 September 1922). To pursue studies of medicine in Germany Saltups left football just several weeks after his single international game. In later years Saltups was quite known in Latvia as a doctor.

External links

Latvian footballers
Latvia international footballers
1901 births
1968 deaths
Association football goalkeepers